Zaza may refer to:

Ethnic group
 Zazas, a group of people in eastern Anatolia (southeastern Turkey)
 Zaza–Gorani languages, Indo-Iranian languages
 Zaza language, spoken by the Zazas

People

Given name
 Zaza Sor. Aree (born 1993), Thai kickboxer
 Zaza Burchuladze (born 1973), Georgian novelist and dramatist
 Zaza Chelidze (born 1987), Georgian football player
 Zaza Chkhaidze (born 1974), Georgian major general 
 Zaza Eloshvili (1964–2001), Georgian footballer
 Zaza Enden (born 1976), Turkish professional wrestler
 Zaza Gogava (born 1971), Georgian Major General
 Zaza Gorozia (born 1975), Georgian politician 
 Zaza Harvey (1879–1954), American baseball player
 Zaza Janashia (born 1976), Georgian footballer
 Zaza Kedelashvili (born 1985), Georgian judoka
 Zaza Kolelishvili (born 1957), Georgian actor, film director and artist 
 Zaza Korinteli (aka Zumba; born 1973), Georgian rock musician, folklorist and civic activist
 ZaZa Maree (born 1997), American singer-songwriter 
 Zaza Nadiradze (born 1993), Georgian canoeist
 Zaza Navrozashvili (born 1992), Georgian rugby player
 Zaza Okuashvili (born 1963), Georgian businessman, politician and philanthropist
 Zaza Pachulia (born 1984), Georgian NBA basketball player
 Zaza Panaskerteli-Tsitsishvili (fl. 15th-century), Georgian prince, politician, and intellectual
 Zaza Revishvili (born 1968), Georgian footballer
 Zaza Rusadze (born 1977), Georgian filmmaker
 Zaza Sikharulidze (born 1960), Georgian politician
 Zaza Tavadze (born 1975), Georgian politician
 Zaza Tkeshelashvili (born 1965), Georgian freestyle wrestler
 Zaza Tsotniashvili (born 1971), Georgian rector of Gori University
 Zaza Turmanidze (born 1965), Georgian wrestler
 Zaza Tuschmalischvili (born 1960), Georgian painter
 Zaza Urushadze (1965–2019), Georgian filmmaker
 Zaza Zazirov (born 1972), Ukrainian Olympic athlete
 Zaza Zirakishvili (born 1975), Georgian football player

Surname
Hend Zaza (born 2009), Syrian Olympic table tennis player
 Karim Zaza (born 1975), Moroccan goalkeeper
 Michele Zaza (born 1945–1994), Italian businessman
 Neil Zaza, American guitar player
 Paul Zaza (1952), Canadian songwriter
 Shane Zaza, British actor
 Simone Zaza (born 1991), Italian footballer
 Welington Zaza (born 1995), Liberian athlete

Places
 Alto Zaza, a commune in Angola
 Zaza Reservoir, a reservoir in Cuba
 Zaza, Rwanda, a community in Rwanda

Other uses
 A name that appears in the Bible, in the first of the Books of Chronicles 2:33, meaning "belonging to all" or "plenty"
 Zaza (play), written by French playwrights Pierre Berton and Charles Simon
 Zaza (1915 film), a 1915 film directed by Edwin S. Porter
 Zaza (1923 film), a 1923 film directed by Allan Dwan
 Zaza (1939 film), a 1939 film directed by George Cukor
 Za-Za, an album by the BulletBoys
 Zazà, a 1900 opera by Ruggero Leoncavallo
 "Zaza", alias of the character Albin in La Cage aux Folles and its derivative works
 Zaza Candy, a brand of kosher candy
 A slang term for cannabis
"Zaza", a song by 6ix9ine

See also
 Zsa Zsa, Hungarian name
 Zazie (disambiguation)
 Zazi

Language and nationality disambiguation pages
Georgian masculine given names